Sarah Lahrkamp ( Withut, born 4 July 1981) is a German politician of the Social Democratic Party (SPD) who has been serving as a Member of the Bundestag since the 2021 federal election.

Political career
Lahrkamp contested Steinfurt I – Borken I and lost to Health Minister Jens Spahn. She won a seat on the party list.

In parliament, Lahrkamp has since been serving on the Committee on Family Affairs, Senior Citizens, Women and Youth. Within her parliamentary group, she belongs to the Parliamentary Left, a left-wing movement.

References 

Living people
1981 births
Members of the Bundestag for the Social Democratic Party of Germany
Members of the Bundestag 2021–2025
21st-century German politicians
21st-century German women politicians
Female members of the Bundestag